Tempo is the speed or pace of a musical piece.

Tempo may also refer to:

Vehicles
 Tempo (bus rapid transit), a bus rapid transit system in Oakland, California
 Tempo (automobile), a German manufacturer of automobiles
 Tempo (railcar), a Canadian railway car type
 Tempo (motorcycle manufacturer), a Norwegian moped and motorcycle manufacturer company
 Ford Tempo, a compact car produced by Ford from the 1984 through 1994 model years
 Optare Tempo, a type of bus built by Optare
 Tecma F1 Tempo, a French hang glider design
 Tempo Group, Chinese automotive components manufacturer
 Force Motors, formerly Bajaj Tempo, an Indian vehicle manufacturer

Publications
 Tempo (journal), a UK quarterly journal of contemporary music
 Tempo (newspaper), a German daily newspaper published in Berlin from 1928-1933
 Tempo (Indonesian magazine), a weekly political magazine in Indonesia
 Tempo (Italian magazine), a defunct weekly magazine
 Tempo (Mozambique magazine), a defunct weekly magazine published in Portuguese East Africa
 Tempo (Serbian magazine), a defunct weekly sports magazine, published in Serbia
 Tempo (Turkey magazine), a weekly news and entertainment magazine in Turkey
 Il Tempo, a daily Italian newspaper published in Rome, Italy
 Koran Tempo, a daily newspaper in Indonesia
 Tempo, a Nigerian publication by P.M. News
 Tempo, a Philippine tabloid published by the Manila Bulletin Group

Food and beverages
 Cadburys Tempo, a chocolate bar in South Africa
 Tempo Beer Industries, an Israeli brewer

Games
 Tempo (chess), an effect of one move in a game of chess 
 Tempo (bridge), the advantage of being on lead in the game of bridge
 Tempo (video game), a 1995 video game for the Sega 32X
 Tempo Storm, a professional video gaming/esports team

Places
 Tempo, County Fermanagh, a village in County Fermanagh, Northern Ireland
 Tempo, Ontario, a small former neighbourhood in London, Ontario, Canada

Media
 "Tempo", a song from Blue's Big Musical Movie
 "Tempo" (Chris Brown song)
 "Tempo" (Exo song)
 "Tempo" (Lizzo song)
 "Tempo" (Margaret song)
 Tempo (EP), by Hepsi in 2006
 Tempo (film), a 2003 film set primarily in Paris
 Tempo (radio show), a classical music radio show on CBC Radio 2
 Tempo FM, an easy listening-oriented radio station based in Wetherby, England
 Tempo Networks, a US-based Caribbean television network

People
 Michael Tempo, American musician
 Nino Tempo (born 1935), American musician, singer, and actor
 Roberto Tempo (1956–2017),  Italian scientist
 Svetozar Vukmanović-Tempo, Montenegrin communist
 Tempo (rapper) (born 1977), Puerto Rican rapper
 T.O.P (rapper) (born 1987), South Korean rapper who formerly used Tempo as a stage name
 Tempo Giusto (composer) (born 1986), Finnish DJ and composer

Business 
 Tempo Records (disambiguation), two different historical record companies
 Tempo Centar, a hypermarket chain in Serbia
 Tempo Discount Department Stores, a discount department store chain that was part of the conglomerate Gamble-Skogmo
 Tempo (brand), a German handkerchief brand

Other uses 
 Tempo (astronomy), a program that determines pulsar parameters from timing observations
 Tempo (app), an artificial intelligence-enhanced calendar application for iOS
 Tempo (comics), a Marvel Comics character
 Tempo (typeface), a 1930 sans-serif typeface
 TEMPO, a chemical compound: 2,2,6,6-tetramethylpiperidine-1-oxy radical
 Acer Tempo, a smartphone series

See also
 Tiempo (disambiguation)